Allison Township may refer to the following townships in the United States:

 Allison Township, Lawrence County, Illinois
 Allison Township, Decatur County, Kansas
 Allison Township, Clinton County, Pennsylvania
 Allison Township, Brown County, South Dakota